Platydesmidae is a family of millipede in the order Platydesmida. There are at least 2 genera and more than 30 described species in Platydesmidae.

Genera
These two genera belong to the family Platydesmidae:
 Desmethus Chamberlin, 1922
 Platydesmus Lucas, 1843

References

Further reading

 
 
 
 

Platydesmida
Millipedes of North America
Articles created by Qbugbot
Millipede families